Charles Alfred Cooper FRSE LLD (16 September 1829 – 14 April 1916) was an English newspaper editor and author. In 1894 he co-founded the Walter Scott Club.

Life

He was born in Hull on 16 September 1829, the son of Charles Cooper, an architect in Hull. He attended Hull Grammar School.

Initially working as a journalist for the Hull Advertiser he rose to be its Sub-editor and Manager. In 1861, he became a political correspondent working at the House of Commons for the Morning Star. In 1868, he resigned his position to become Assistant Editor to Alexander Russel in The Scotsman newspaper in Edinburgh. When Russel died in 1876, Cooper was placed to take over, but the position was partly filled by Robert Wallace for four years before Cooper eventually took over as full editor in 1880. He served as editor for 25 years, until retiring in 1906 (aged 76) to be replaced by John Pettigrew Croal.

During his period as editor he lived at 15 Charlotte Square, one of Edinburgh’s most prestigious addresses.

In 1890, he was elected a Fellow of the Royal Society of Edinburgh his proposers including Alexander Crum Brown, Sir Arthur Mitchell and John McLaren, Lord McLaren. The University of Edinburgh awarded him a Doctor of Letters (LLD) in 1907.

He died in Eastbourne on 14 April 1916.

He is buried in Dean Cemetery in western Edinburgh with his wife Susanna, who had died in 1887, and two of their sons: Frank Towers Cooper KC (1883–1915) and James Cooper (1866–1929). The grave lies on the north wall of the first north extension.

Publications
Letters on Egypt (1891)
Letters on South Africa (1895)
An Editor’s Retrospect (1896) (an autobiography)

Family
In 1852, he married Susannah Towers (d. 1887). His second wife, Mabel, died in 1931.

References

1829 births
1916 deaths
British journalists
People associated with Edinburgh
Fellows of the Royal Society of Edinburgh